Mymensingh Sadar is an upazila of Mymensingh District in the Division of Mymensingh, Bangladesh.

Geography
It has 104,567 units of household and its total area is 388.45 km2. The River Brahmaputra just crosses the section of Mymensingh. A hundred plus years ago the river was widened 5–10 km and now it is a seasonal flow, not an ever-flowing river. A huge land recovered from this riverbed for a hundred years as named 'chars' is a big part of Mymensingh and as it was riverine land regular seasonal flood water namely from the Garo hills of Meghalaya Of India flashes up to these char's. Flood is some where seasonal reasons for refreshing fertility of land and a trend of native fishes add some protein budget assistance in this poor CHAR villages.

Demographics
According to the 2011 Bangladesh census, Mymensingh Sadar had a population of 775,733. Males constituted 50.43% of the population and females 49.57%. Muslims formed 93.83% of the population, Hindus 5.96%, Christians 0.17% and others 0.04%. Mymensingh Sadar had a literacy rate of 51.74% for the population 7 years and above.

As of the 1991 Bangladesh census, Mymensingh Sadar had a population of 566,368. Males constituted 52.18% of the population, and females 47.82%. This Upazila's eighteen-up population was 284,112. Mymensingh Sadar has an average literacy rate of 37% (7+ years), and the national average of 32.4% literate.

Administration
Mymensingh Sadar Upazila is divided into 13 union parishads: Aqua, Austadhar, Bhabkhali, Bororchar, Boyra, Char Ishwardia, Char Nilaxmia, Dapunia, Ghagra, Khagdohor, Kushtia, Paranganj, and Sirta. The union parishads are subdivided into 136 mauzas and 175 villages.

See also
Upazilas of Bangladesh
Districts of Bangladesh
Divisions of Bangladesh
 Mymensingh

References

Upazilas of Mymensingh District